Louisiana elected its members July 1–3, 1816.

See also 
 1816 and 1817 United States House of Representatives elections
 List of United States representatives from Louisiana

1816
Louisiana
United States House of Representatives